Lisbon Township occupies the 6 mile square on the southern edge of Kendall County, Illinois. As of the 2010 census, its population was 899 and it contained 322 housing units.

Early settler John Moore was credited with naming Lisbon Township after Lisbon, Portugal, commenting he wanted a name that was "different."  It contains portions of the communities of Helmar, Lisbon and Plattville.  With a population of just under 1,000, it is the least-populous township in Kendall County.

Geography

Demographics

Government
The township is governed by an elected Town Board of a Supervisor and four Trustees.  The Township also has an elected Assessor, Clerk, and Highway Commissioner.

References
 

Townships in Kendall County, Illinois
Townships in Illinois